Malladi Vishnu is an Indian politician and was a legislator belonging to YSR Congress Party. He served as vuda chairman for Vijayawada during YSR time. He represented Vijayawada Central assembly constituency.

References

Living people
Indian National Congress politicians
Telugu people
Year of birth missing (living people)
Andhra Pradesh MLAs 2019–2024
Indian National Congress politicians from Andhra Pradesh